The Government entities of Colombia are entities of the government of Colombia. The government entities is made up by commissions, control agencies, administrative departments, directorates, funds, superintendencies, among other. Some of these agencies are under the supervision of the President of Colombia with special autonomy.

Commissions

 Comision de Regulacion de Telecomunicaciones: commission that regulates the telecommunications industry trade.

Administrative departments

Administrative Department of the Presidency of the Republic - DAPR
Administrative Department of Public Service - DAFP
Administrative Department of Science, Technology and Innovation - Colciencias
Administrative Department of Sport, Recreation, Physical Activity and the Use of Free Time - Coldeportes
Administrative Department of Statistics - DANE
Administrative Department of Planning - DNP
Administrative Department of the National Intelligence Directorate - DNI
Administrative Department of Social Prosperity - DPS

References

External links

Commissions 

 Comision de Regulacion de Telecomunicaciones

Administrative departments

 Aeronáutica Civil de Colombia
 Departamento Administrativo de Ciencia, Tecnología e Innovación
 Departamento Administrativo Nacional de Estadística
 Departamento Administrativo de Seguridad
 Departamento Administrativo de la Función Pública
 Departamento Administrativo de la Presidencia de la República

Executive branch of Colombia
Government of Colombia